The New Testament (French: Le nouveau testament) is a 1936 French comedy film directed by Sacha Guitry and starring Guitry, Jacqueline Delubac and Christian Gérard. It was adapted by Guitry from his own 1934 play of the same title.

It was shot at the Saint-Maurice Studios in Paris. The film's sets were designed by the art director Maurice Dufrêne.

Cast
 Sacha Guitry as Le docteur Marcelin 
 Jacqueline Delubac as Juliette Lecourtois 
 Christian Gérard as Fernand Worms 
 Betty Daussmond as Lucie Marcelin 
 Charles Dechamps as Monsieur Worms 
 Marguerite Templey as Madame Worms 
 Pauline Carton as Mademoiselle Morot 
 Louis Kerly as Le domestique

References

Bibliography 
 Dayna Oscherwitz & MaryEllen Higgins. The A to Z of French Cinema. Scarecrow Press, 2009.

External links 
 

1936 films
1936 comedy films
French comedy films
1930s French-language films
Films directed by Sacha Guitry
French films based on plays
Tobis Film films
1930s French films